Sir Rutherford Ness "Bob" Robertson AC CMG FAA FRS HFRSE (29 September 1913 – 6 March 2001) was an Australian botanist and biologist, and winner of the Clarke Medal in 1955.

Life

Robertson was born in Melbourne, Victoria (Australia), the son of Rev J. Robertson.

He was educated at St. Andrew's College, Christchurch and obtained a Bachelor of Science (BSc) degree at the University of Sydney in 1934.

In 1939, Robertson completed a Doctorate of Philosophy (PhD) at St John's College, Cambridge in England. Later in 1939, Robertson became Assistant Lecturer, and later Lecturer in Botany at the University of Sydney. From 1952 to 1955 he was Senior Principal Research Officer at the CSIRO Division of Food Preservation and Transport.

Family

In 1937 he married Mary Helen Bruce Rogerson.

Publications

Science: Its Scope and Limits (1971)

Honours and awards
1954 Elected Fellow of the Australian Academy of Science
1955 Awarded Clarke Medal by the Royal Society of New South Wales. 
1961 Elected Fellow of the Royal Society
1962 Elected a Foreign Associate of the United States National Academy of Sciences
1968 Created a Companion of the Order of St Michael and St George (CMG) 
1970 Winner of the Mueller Medal
1971 Elected to the American Philosophical Society
1972 Knighted by Queen Elizabeth II
1973 Elected to the American Academy of Arts and Sciences
1975 Awarded Macfarlane Burnet Medal and Lecture by the Australian Academy of Science
1980 Awarded Companion of the Order of Australia (AC).
1983 Elected an Honorary Fellow of the Royal Society of Edinburgh

References

1913 births
2001 deaths
Scientists from Melbourne
People educated at St Andrew's College, Christchurch
Alumni of St John's College, Cambridge
20th-century Australian botanists
Fellows of the Australian Academy of Science
Companions of the Order of Australia
Australian Knights Bachelor
Australian Companions of the Order of St Michael and St George
Presidents of the Australian Academy of Science
Australian Fellows of the Royal Society
Foreign associates of the National Academy of Sciences
Members of the American Philosophical Society